Rodman Flender (born June 9, 1962) is an American actor, writer, director and producer.

Early life and education
Flender was born and raised in a Jewish family in New York City, the son of Enid (née Rodman), a former Broadway dancer, and Harold Flender (1924—1975), a writer and screenwriter. Flender's early acting roles included Mischa in the Broadway production of Zalmen or the Madness of God and Charles Francis Adams in the PBS series The Adams Chronicles. He graduated from the drama department of New York's High School of Performing Arts and studied acting at the Webber Douglas Academy of Dramatic Art in London, United Kingdom. He received his undergraduate degree at Harvard University, where he wrote for The Harvard Lampoon. Flender majored in Visual and Environmental Studies and studied documentary filmmaking with Ed Pincus and Ross McElwee, who inspired him with an enthusiasm for the documentaries.

Career
Independent filmmaker Roger Corman hired Flender out of college to run the advertising department of his Concorde-New Horizons Films. With his goal toward directing, Flender moved into production and was Corman's Vice President of Production for two years. He produced or co-produced titles including Body Chemistry, Streets, and Full Fathom Five. Flender made his feature directing debut with the Corman-produced thriller The Unborn, which received favorable reviews. Flender next wrote and directed In The Heat of Passion, also for Roger Corman.

Over the next decade, Flender's feature directing credits included Leprechaun 2 for Trimark, and the Columbia Pictures release Idle Hands. Flender became a busy director of television episodes and pilots. TV credits include multiple episodes of the comedies The Office and Ugly Betty; dramas that include Chicago Hope, Gilmore Girls and The O.C.; and horror with HBO's Tales From The Crypt. As a writer, Flender's credits include Tales From The Crypt and the feature film Roger Corman’s Dracula Rising.

In 1998, he began filming a musical portrait of the Boston-based rock band The Upper Crust, and directed Dawson's Creek episode "The Scare", a parody of Scream. Developments within the band led Flender to continue shooting on and off for the next five years. The resulting documentary, Let Them Eat Rock, played film festivals in 2005 and 2006 to mostly positive notices. Following the 2010 Tonight Show conflict, Flender joined Conan O'Brien (whom he knew since their days at Harvard) on the road, as part of the Legally Prohibited from Being Funny on Television Tour, and filmed the ongoings behind-the-scenes, onstage and between shows. The documentary, titled Conan O'Brien Can't Stop, was released in select theatres on June 24, 2011, which Roger Ebert featured on his list of best documentaries of 2011.

With the documentary completed, Flender returned to directing television in multiple genres, including episodes of the comedies Suburgatory and Super Fun Night in 2014, the drama Finding Carter and multiple episodes of the thriller Scream in 2015 and 2016. Flender directed two episodes of the 2016-2017 science fiction series People of Earth and returned to character-based drama in 2019, directing Kirsten Dunst in the Showtime original series On Becoming a God in Central Florida.

Rodman Flender completed his next feature film in 2019, when he mixed romantic comedy, horror and the road movie with Eat, Brains, Love. It premiered at the London FrightFest Film Festival to positive reviews  and won Best Picture at the 2019 Screamfest Horror Film Festival. In 2022, footage from "The Scare" was incorporated into the Matt Bettinelli-Olpin and Tyler Gillett film Scream.

Personal life
He is married to American writer and producer Amy Lippman. His nephew is Academy Award-nominated actor Timothée Chalamet. His son is Haskell Flender. Haskell also attended Harvard University and was a member of the Harvard Lampoon.

References

External links

1962 births
American television directors
Living people
The Harvard Lampoon alumni
Film directors from New York City
Film producers from New York (state)
American male film actors
Male actors from New York City
American people of Austrian-Jewish descent
American people of Russian-Jewish descent
American people of Belarusian-Jewish descent
Fiorello H. LaGuardia High School alumni
Horror film directors